Denbo is a populated place in the Centerville, Washington County, Pennsylvania, United States. It is a coal patch town, located near the former Vesta No. 6 Mine.

History
Vesta No. 6 was owned and operated by Jones and Laughlin Steel Company. It was located in the Klondike Coalfield. A patch town was built to house miners. The mine ran from about 1903 until 1947. The entryway was sealed and covered over.

Notable people
Joe Freeman, football player
Joe Ratica, football player

References

External links 
 http://pennsylvania.hometownlocator.com/pa/washington/denbo.cfm
 DENBO, PA (VESTA NO. 6) - appalachian coalfields
 
 

Unincorporated communities in Washington County, Pennsylvania
Unincorporated communities in Pennsylvania
Coal towns in Pennsylvania